Natalya Romanivna Pipa (born 12 October 1983) is a Ukrainian politician currently serving as a People's Deputy of Ukraine representing Ukraine's 115th electoral district as a member of Holos. She is a member of the Ukrainian Galician Party. Prior to her election, she was a local leader of the Ukrainian Galician Party in the city of Lviv.

Early life and career 
In 1997, Pipa joined Plast, Ukraine's national scouting organisation. She was a member of the AIESEC from 2000 to 2004.

In 2000, Pipa graduated from Lviv Specialized Secondary School No. 8, where she studied the German language extensively. In 2005, she obtained her higher education in "Economic cybernetics" at the University of Lviv. In 2018, she graduated from the Ukrainian Catholic University, completing programs of study including the "Management of non-profit organizations", "Effective governance", "Good governance for good leaders".

From 2004 to 2013, Pipa worked as an insurance broker at the "Expert" brokerage. Since 2013, she has been a manager of external relations (fundraiser) at the Dzherelo Centre for Children and Youth with Special Needs.

Political career 
Pipa is also responsible for the creation of the Sykhivskyi Green Path, a urban green space near Lviv's Dovzhenko Theatre, a lecture series from the City Workshop and Deutsche Gesellschaft für Internationale Zusammenarbeit, and a variety of eco-fairs and festivals with the intention of promoting environmental awareness in Lviv.

From 2015 to 2019, she was a member of the Ukrainian Galician Party, serving as the head of the Lviv city branch of the party from 2015 to 2016.

In the 2015 Ukrainian local elections, Pipa was an unsuccessful candidate for the Lviv Oblast Council and Lviv City Council in the Sykhivskyi District.

From November 2016, she was an assistant to Ihor Volodymyrovych Dyakovich, a deputy of the Lviv City Council.

During the 2019 Ukrainian parliamentary election, Pipa was the candidate of Holos in Ukraine's 115th electoral district. She was successfully elected.

People's Deputy of Ukraine 
Pipa is currently a People's Deputy of Ukraine and a member of the Holos faction. She is secretary of the Verkhovna Rada Committee on Education, Science and Innovation. Among her projects are the development of a senior professional school, the promotion of the Ukrainian language in education, and the establishment of boundaries and protections for parks in Lviv.

In June 2021, she announced her participation in the newly-formed Justice parliamentary group, citing her lack of confidence in Kira Rudyk.

References

External links 
 Natalya Pipa on Facebook
 Verkhovna Rada (in Ukrainian)
 Natalya Pipa website (in Ukrainian)

1983 births
Living people
Politicians from Lviv
Ukrainian Catholic University alumni
Ninth convocation members of the Verkhovna Rada
Justice Party (Ukraine) politicians
Women members of the Verkhovna Rada